Allogromia is a genus of Foraminifera.

Species:

References

Foraminifera genera